Adenylate kinase isoenzyme 4, mitochondrial is an enzyme that in humans is encoded by the AK4 gene.

This gene encodes a member of the adenylate kinase family of enzymes. The encoded protein is localized to the mitochondrial matrix. Adenylate kinases regulate the adenine and guanine nucleotide compositions within a cell by catalyzing the reversible transfer of phosphate group among these nucleotides. Five isozymes of adenylate kinase have been identified in vertebrates. Expression of these isozymes is tissue-specific and developmentally regulated. A pseudogene for this gene has been located on chromosome 17. Three transcript variants encoding the same protein have been identified for this gene. Sequence alignment suggests that the gene defined by NM_013410, NM_203464, and NM_001005353 is located on chromosome 1.  Expression of AK4 may regulate global cellular ATP levels and modulate the AMPK signaling pathway.

References

External links

Further reading